Tin Shing Court is a Home Ownership Scheme court developed by the Hong Kong Housing Authority in Tin Shui Wai, New Territories, Hong Kong, near Tin Yiu Estate, Light Rail Tin Yiu stop and Tin Shui Wai stop as well as MTR Tin Shui Wai station. It has totally 17 residential buildings completed in 1999.

Houses

Demographics
According to the 2016 by-census, Tin Shing Court had a population of 20,664. The median age was 43.4 and the majority of residents (96.5 per cent) were of Chinese ethnicity. The average household size was 3.3 people. The median monthly household income of all households (i.e. including both economically active and inactive households) was HK$30,000.

Politics
For the 2019 District Council election, the estate fell within two constituencies. Most of the estate is located in the Tin Shing constituency, which is represented by Hau Man-kin. The remainder falls within the Shing Yan constituency, which is represented by Au Kwok-kuen.

See also

Public housing estates in Tin Shui Wai
List of Home Ownership Scheme Courts in Hong Kong

References

Tin Shui Wai
Home Ownership Scheme
Residential buildings completed in 1999
1999 establishments in Hong Kong